Pieter Tuhoro (born 1987), known by his stage name Pieter T, is a New Zealand R&B singer and music producer. He was originally a member in the short lived music group, Boyband in 2006. Pieter T made his solo musical debut in 2009 with the single Cold Nights followed by the singles, Stay With Me, Can't Stop Loving You and Something Else which peaked at number six on the NZ Radio Charts. His latest release is the single the Business feat. PNC and Dei Hamo off his debut album Life, Love and Lessons.

Career
In 2006, Pieter won a radio station competition on The Edge to become a member in a manufactured New Zealand boy band. As part of the group he was given the nickname, (Cute Boy). Since the band disbanded in late 2006, he has been the only member to continue pursuing a music career.

In late 2008, Pieter met NZ urban artist Chong Nee who co-signed him to Kog Mastering / trading as Handmade Records. Kog Studio quickly starting working alongside him as he brought in producers such as Rahxx, Paurini Wiringi and David Nesian to create tracks for his debut album.

Album
Pieter moved to Auckland from Hamilton in 2009. He is signed to Handmade Records.
"Life, Love and Lessons" is his first studio album.

He commented on the writing process for the album:

'Life, Love and Lessons' includes collaborations with artists and producers including, Chong Nee, Aaradhna, PNC, Dei Hamo, Truth, Vince Harder and Rachel Fraser. Pieter writes his own songs, he has also musically produced each track on the album.

Pieter's first self released single 'Cold Nights' is still heavily requested on NZ radio. The summer release 'Business' leapt up the charts without a music video. 'Can't Stop Loving You', peaked at number 9 on the radio charts. The single 'Something Else' hit the charts peaking at #6. His latest single is "Let You Go".

The entire album was recorded Mixed and mastered at Kog Studio, in Auckland. It was released on 20 June 2010.
Due to demand he will be touring with Dei Hamo and Smashproof nationwide in August 2011.

Discography

Singles

Albums
 2010 – Life, Love and Lessons
 2013 – Completion (#34 NZ)
 2018 – Goliath

References

External links
 http://www.pieterT.com
 https://www.myspace.com/pietertmusicnz
 http://www.amplifier.co.nz/artist/44174/pieter-t.html
 http://www.hustlemanagement.com

APRA Award winners
New Zealand pop singers
New Zealand contemporary R&B singers
1987 births
Living people
21st-century New Zealand male singers